Antoine Lehoux (born October 27, 1993) is a Canadian ice sledge hockey player. He competed at the 2022 Winter Paralympics in Para ice hockey, winning a silver medal.

He was in the Canadian Armed Forces reserves.

References

External links 
 Antoine Lehoux of Canada in action with Cho Young-jae of South Korea during Para Ice Hockey March 11, 2022. Peter Cziborra

1993 births
Living people
Canadian sledge hockey players
Paralympic sledge hockey players of Canada
Paralympic silver medalists for Canada
Paralympic medalists in sledge hockey
Para ice hockey players at the 2022 Winter Paralympics
Medalists at the 2022 Winter Paralympics
21st-century Canadian military personnel